The 1967 Wimbledon Championships took place on the outdoor grass courts at the All England Lawn Tennis and Croquet Club in Wimbledon, London, United Kingdom. The tournament was held from Monday 26 June until Saturday 8 July 1967. It was the 81st staging of the Wimbledon Championships, and the third Grand Slam tennis event of 1967. John Newcombe and Billie Jean King won the singles titles.

Launch of colour television
The first colour television broadcast in the UK, as well as in Europe, took place on 1 July 1967, the first Saturday of the Championships, when, starting at 2pm, four hours of live coverage of the Championships was shown on BBC2 presented by David Vine and with commentary from Keith Fordyce. The first match broadcast in colour was Cliff Drysdale against Roger Taylor and was played on the Centre Court. Additional colour broadcasts were made during the afternoons of the following week as well as 30-minute highlight programmes shown each evening.

Champions

Seniors

Men's singles

 John Newcombe defeated  Wilhelm Bungert, 6–3, 6–1, 6–1

Women's singles

 Billie Jean King defeated  Ann Jones, 6–3, 6–4

Men's doubles

 Bob Hewitt /  Frew McMillan defeated  Roy Emerson /  Ken Fletcher, 6–2, 6–3, 6–4

Women's doubles

 Rosie Casals /  Billie Jean King defeated  Maria Bueno /  Nancy Richey, 9–11, 6–4, 6–2

Mixed doubles

 Owen Davidson /  Billie Jean King defeated  Ken Fletcher /  Maria Bueno, 7–5, 6–2

Juniors

Boys' singles

 Manuel Orantes defeated  Mike Estep, 6–2, 6–0

Girls' singles

 Judith Salomé defeated  Margaretta Strandberg, 6–4, 6–2

See also
Wimbledon Pro

References

External links
 Official Wimbledon Championships website

 
Wimbledon Championships
Wimbledon Championships
Wimbledon Championships
Wimbledon Championships